The second stage of the 2013 Liga Indonesia Premier Division (LI) was played from 28 June to 27 August 2013. A total of twelve teams competed in the second stage.

Draw
The draw for the group stage was held in June 2013, at the Liga Indonesia House in Jakarta, Indonesia. The 12 teams were drawn into three groups of four.

Format
In the group stage, each group was played on a home-and-away round-robin basis. The winners of each group and one best runners-up advanced to the semi-finals.

Tiebreakers
The teams are ranked according to points (3 points for a win, 1 point for a tie, 0 points for a loss). If tied on points, tiebreakers are applied in the following order:
Greater number of points obtained in the group matches between the teams concerned
Goal difference resulting from the group matches between the teams concerned
Greater number of goals scored in the group matches between the teams concerned (away goals do not apply)
Goal difference in all the group matches
Greater number of goals scored in all the group matches
Kicks from the penalty mark if only two teams are involved and they are both on the field of play
Fewer score calculated according to the number of yellow and red cards received in the group matches (1 point for each yellow card, 3 points for each red card as a consequence of two yellow cards, 3 points for each direct red card, 4 points for each yellow card followed by a direct red card)
Drawing of lots

Groups
The matchdays were 28 June, 2 July, 6 July, 19 August, 24/25 August, and 30 August 2013.

Group A

Group B

Group C

References

second